Niblock is a surname. Notable people with the surname include:

David Niblock (born 1981), Irish Gaelic footballer
Mickey Niblock, Irish Gaelic footballer
Phill Niblock (born 1933), American composer and filmmaker
Robert Niblock, American business executive, CEO of Lowe’s

See also
Niblack